This is a list of alternative names for currency. A currency refers to money in any form when in actual use or circulation as a medium of exchange, especially circulating banknotes and coins. A more general definition is that a currency is a system of money (monetary units) in common use, especially in a nation.

Alternative names for currency

English Currency (Cockney Rhyming Slang) 
 Generic Term: "bread" from "Bread & Honey" for "Money"
 £5: "Lady Godiva" or "fiver"
 £10: "cockle" from "Cock & Hen" or "tenner"
 £1000: "bag" from "Bag of Sand" for "grand"

Other 
 Aussie – Australian dollar
 Bank 
 Benjamins 
 Benjie – a name for a USD $100 bill that was sometimes tucked away by touring deadheads for emergency use
 Bills 
 Bones 
 Bread 
 Buck/bucks 
 C-note - slang for $100 bill (for the Roman numeral C, meaning 100)
 Cabbage 
 Cheddar
 Clams 
 Coin 
 Cream
Chips
 Dead presidents 
 Dosh
Dough 
 Fiver  – £5 note, USD $5 bill
 Grand  – £1,000, USD $1,000
 Greenbacks 
Green Stuff
 Gs – Increments of USD $1,000
 Jackson  – USD $20 bill
 Kiwi – slang term for the currency of New Zealand
 Large  – £1,000, USD $1,000
 Lettuce 
 Loonie – refers to the Canadian dollar, because the Canadian dollar coin has an image of the common loon on its reverse side
 Loot
 Moolah 
 P - money, pennies
 Quid - Pound sterling
 Racks - large sums of money, 10 of these make one stack
 Rocks - coins
 Sawbuck 
 Scratch 
 Singles
 Smackers
 Soft money – a colloquial term for paper currency in the United States
 Spot – such as "five spot", "ten spot", etc.
 Stacks - large sums of money, 10 racks
 Tenner  – £10 note, USD $10 bill
 Toonie – Canadian two dollar coin
 Two bits
 Wad
 Wonga - British slang 
 Conto - Brazilian Real
 Pau - Brazilian Real
 Pila - Brazilian Real

See also

 Slang terms for money
 List of currencies
 List of historical currencies

References

Alternative names
Slang